John A. Young (March 26, 1854 – July 28, 1934) was a Canadian politician. He served in the Legislative Assembly of New Brunswick as member of the Conservative party representing York County from 1908 to 1925.

References

20th-century Canadian politicians
1854 births
1934 deaths
Progressive Conservative Party of New Brunswick MLAs